This is a list of all tornadoes that were confirmed by local offices of the National Weather Service in the United States from September to October 2009.

September

September 2 event

September 3 event

September 6 event

September 7 event

September 16 event

September 20 event

September 22 event

September 24 event

October

Note: 1 tornado was confirmed in the final totals, but does not have a listed rating.

October 1 event

October 3 event

October 7 event

October 9 event

October 15 event

October 22 event

October 23 event

October 26 event

October 27 event

October 29 event

October 30 event

See also

Tornadoes of 2009

References

Tornadoes of 2009
2009, 09
September 2009 events in the United States
October 2009 events in the United States